Aquavit is a Scandinavian restaurant located at 65 East 55th Street in Midtown Manhattan, New York City. In November 2016, an outpost was launched in London by Philip Hamilton.

History
Aquavit was created and opened by Håkan Swahn in 1987. and was a pioneer in New York in creating two distinct dining rooms, a casual café with modern but rustic fare as well as a cutting-edge modern dining room. This was conceptually based on the Stockholm restaurant, Operakällaren, whose owner, Tore Wretman, was one of Aquavit’s original partners. Aquavit with the arrival of Chef Marcus Samuelsson in 1995 garnered greater culinary recognition.

After 17 years in one location (13 West 54th Street), Aquavit relocated in 2005 to new premises, giving the restaurant an entirely new look. Aquavit opened a second restaurant in Minneapolis, Minnesota in 1999, but it failed to take hold and ultimately closed in mid-2003.

Aquavit enjoyed a three-star rating from The New York Times from 1995 until 2010, and 2015 onward. and was ranked by New York Magazine in 2006 as the 9th-best restaurant in New York.

In 2002 the cook book “Aquavit and the new Scandinavian Cuisine” was written by Marcus Samuelsson based on the food of the restaurant.

Awards
The restaurant has received a number of awards and accolades over the years, including:

 Two stars in the Michelin Guide in 2015-2022; one star in the Michelin Guide in 2013-2014
 Three star rating by the New York Times in 2015 
AAA Five Star Award (2022)
 Selected 9th-best restaurant in New York 2006 by New York Magazine
 Marcus Samuelsson voted Best Chef New York in 2003 by The James Beard Foundation
 Inducted in Restaurant Hall of Fame USA in 2000
 Receiving the Ivy Award
 Best Sunday Brunch New York Magazine

In 2013, Zagats gave it a food rating of 25.

See also
 List of Scandinavian restaurants
 List of Michelin starred restaurants in New York City

References

External links
Official website

1987 establishments in New York City
Midtown Manhattan
Restaurants established in 1987
Restaurants in Manhattan
Scandinavian restaurants in the United States
Swedish-American culture in New York (state)
Michelin Guide starred restaurants in New York (state)
European restaurants in New York City